Circumferential Road 6 (C-6), informally known as the C-6 Road, is a network of roads and bridges that all together will form the sixth and outermost beltway of Metro Manila in the Philippines once it is completed.

The road would link Metro Manila with the provinces of Bulacan in the north, Rizal in the east, and Cavite in the south, passing through the cities of Pasig, Taguig, and Muntinlupa.

Route description

Taguig

C-6 in Taguig is a four-lane road which was built in 2009 along the shore of Laguna de Bay. In February 2017, the road was widened to four lanes and has been renamed by the Department of Public Works and Highways as the Laguna Lake Highway.

The road is planned to link to the proposed Laguna Lakeshore Expressway Dike.

See also
List of roads in Metro Manila

References

Proposed roads in the Philippines
Roads in Bulacan
Roads in Cavite
Roads in Rizal
Routes in Metro Manila